Samuel Penhallow (July 2, 1665 – December 2, 1726) was a Cornish colonist and historian and militia leader in present-day Maine during Queen Anne's War and Father Rale's War.  He was the commander at Fort Menaskoux and was attacked during the Northeast Coast Campaign (1724).

Life

He was born at St Mabon, Cornwall, England. From 1683 to 1686 he attended a school at Newington Green (near London) conducted by the Rev. Charles Morton (1627–1698), a dissenting clergyman, with whom he emigrated to Massachusetts in 1686. He was commissioned by the Society for the Propagation of the Gospel in New England to study the Indian languages and to preach to the Indians; but he was soon diverted from this work. Removing to Portsmouth, New Hampshire, he there married Mary Cutt, a daughter of John Cutt (1625–1681), president of the Province of New Hampshire in 1679, a successful merchant and mill-owner, and thus came into possession of considerable property (including much of the present site of Portsmouth). In 1700 he was speaker of the Assembly and in 1702 became a member of the Provincial Council, but was suspended by Lieutenant-Governor George Vaughan (1676–1724). Penhallow, however, was sustained by Governor Samuel Shute (1662–1742), and Vaughan was removed from office in 1716. In 1714 Penhallow was appointed a justice of the superior court of judicature, and from 1717 until his death was chief justice of that court; and he also served as treasurer of the province in 1699–1726, and as Secretary of the province in 1714–1726. He died at Portsmouth on 2 December 1726.

Works
 
 Penhallow's Indian Wars; A Facsimile Reprint of the First Edition, Printed in Boston in 1726

References

1665 births
1726 deaths
People in Father Rale's War
Kingdom of England emigrants to Massachusetts Bay Colony
American historians
People of colonial New Hampshire
Writers from Cornwall
18th-century American historians
British emigrants
People of Cornish descent